O'Connor Street is a downtown arterial road in Ottawa, Ontario, Canada. It is a north-south route, operating one way southbound, providing a key thoroughfare parallel to Bank Street.

The roadway begins at Wellington Street, at Parliament Hill, proceeding south towards the Queensway (Highway 417) where there is a westbound on-ramp. South of the Queensway, O'Connor continues as a local street in The Glebe neighbourhood until it reaches its southern terminus at Holmwood Avenue.

A two-way cycle track was built along the east side of the street in 2016.

Major intersections
(from North to South):
 Wellington Street
 Sparks Street
 Albert Street
 Slater Street
 Laurier Avenue
 Somerset Street
 Gladstone Avenue
 Catherine Street
 Highway 417 (Queensway)
 Isabella Street
 Fifth Avenue
 Holmwood Avenue

See also
Dominion-Chalmers United Church (O'Connor at Lisgar)
High Commission of Australia in Ottawa
High Commission of The Bahamas in Ottawa (at 50 O'Connor)
Ottawa Curling Club (at 440 O'Connor)

References

Ottawa Transportation Master Plan, see map 7 Central Area/Inner City Road Network

Roads in Ottawa